At least three ships of the Royal Netherlands Navy have been named HNLMS Pelikaan after the Dutch word for Pelecanidae:

 , formerly HMS Thruster (F131), was a logistic support vessel of the Royal Netherlands Navy, served from 1947 to 1973
 , was a logistic support vessel of the Royal Netherlands Navy, served from 1990 to 2006.
 , is a logistic support vessel of the Royal Netherlands Navy, entered service in 2006.

Royal Netherlands Navy ship names